The Generals Highway is a highway that connects State Route 180 and State Route 198 through Sequoia National Park, Sequoia National Forest, Giant Sequoia National Monument, and Kings Canyon National Park in the Sierra Nevada of California. As the road goes through national parks and monuments, the highway is primarily maintained by the federal government instead of a California State Highway controlled by Caltrans.

Route description

It is named after two of the largest and most famous Giant Sequoia trees, the General Sherman and General Grant trees. The highway is notoriously steep, narrow, winding, and difficult to drive, especially its southern section from Hospital Rock to Giant Forest within Sequoia National Park. This section also consists of numerous switchbacks, and has a speed limit of 10 MPH. Furthermore, the highway north of Lodgepole campground generally closes due to snow conditions, and is not plowed between the Friday after January 1 and the third Friday in March. 

The Generals Highway begins as a continuation of SR 198, where the state highway legally ends at the southern boundary of Sequoia National Park. The road travels northeast along the middle fork of the Kaweah River and enters Sequoia National Park through the Indian Head Entrance. Near the Hospital Rock turnout, the road turns north and goes through several turns before straightening out and continuing northeast, passing near the General Sherman Tree. At Lodgepole Bridge, the road turns west before later turning north. Generals Highway leaves Sequoia National Park through the North Entrance, entering Sequoia National Forest. The road continues northwest through Giant Sequoia National Monument before traveling along the northern border of Kings Canyon National Park, briefly entering it before terminating at SR 180.

History
Two of the stone bridges on the highway are listed on the National Register of Historic Places.

Major intersections

See also

References

External links

Roads in Tulare County, California
Giant Sequoia National Monument
Kings Canyon National Park
Sequoia National Park
Sequoia National Forest
Historic American Engineering Record in California
National Register of Historic Places in Tulare County, California
Named highways in California